This is a list of 193 species in Calathus, a genus of ground beetles in the family Carabidae.

Calathus species

 Calathus abaxoides Brullé, 1839 c g
 Calathus acuticollis Putzeys, 1873 c g
 Calathus advena (LeConte, 1846) i b
 Calathus aeneocupreus (Heinz, 1971) c g
 Calathus aethiopicus Alluaud, 1918 c g
 Calathus aethiops Alluaud, 1937 c g
 Calathus afroalpinus Lassalle, 2016 c g
 Calathus albanicus Apfelbeck, 1906 c g
 Calathus algens Andrewes, 1934 c g
 Calathus alternans Faldermann, 1836 c g
 Calathus ambigens Bates, 1891 i c g
 Calathus ambiguus (Paykull, 1790) c g
 Calathus amplius Escalera, 1921 c g
 Calathus anatolicus Jedlicka, 1969 c g
 Calathus angularis Brullé, 1839 c g
 Calathus angustulus Wollaston, 1862 c g
 Calathus anistschenkoi Berlov & Ippolitova, 2005 c g
 Calathus ankoberensis Lassalle, 2016 c g
 Calathus annapurnae J.Schmidt, 1999 c g
 Calathus appendiculatus Wollaston, 1862 c g
 Calathus arcuatus Gautier des Cottes, 1870 c g
 Calathus ascendens Wollaston, 1862 c g
 Calathus asturiensis Vuillefroy, 1866 c g
 Calathus atitari Novoa, 1999 c g
 Calathus auctus Wollaston, 1862 c g
 Calathus aztec Ball and Nègre, 1972 i c g
 Calathus baeticus Rambur, 1837 c g
 Calathus baleensis Lassalle, 2016 c g
 Calathus balli Novoa; Gañan & Baselga, 2015 c g
 Calathus bolivari Nègre, 1970 i c g
 Calathus bosnicus Ganglbauer, 1891 c g
 Calathus brevis Gautier des Cottes, 1866 c g
 Calathus busii F.Battoni, 1984 c g
 Calathus calceus Ball and Nègre, 1972 i c g
 Calathus canariensis Harold, 1868 c g
 Calathus carballalae Novoa & Gañán, 2014 c g
 Calathus carinatus Brullé, 1839 c g
 Calathus carvalhoi Serrano & Borges, 1986 c g
 Calathus casalei F.Battoni, 1986 c g
 Calathus caucasicus Chaudoir, 1846 c g
 Calathus chioriae Lassalle, 2016 c g
 Calathus chokeensis Lassalle, 2016 c g
 Calathus ciliatus Wollaston, 1862 c g
 Calathus cinctus Motschulsky, 1850 c g
 Calathus circumseptus Germar, 1824 c g
 Calathus clauseni Ball and Nègre, 1972 i c g
 Calathus cognatus Wollaston, 1864 c g
 Calathus colasianus Mateu, 1970 c g
 Calathus complanatus Dejean, 1828 c g
 Calathus deliae Morvan, 1999 c g
 Calathus deplanatus Chaudoir, 1843 c g
 Calathus depressus Brullé, 1836 c g
 Calathus deyrollei Gautier des Cottes, 1870 c g
 Calathus distinguendus Chaudoir, 1846 c g
 Calathus dubaulti Lassalle, 2016 c g
 Calathus durango Ball and Nègre, 1972 i c g
 Calathus ellipticus Reitter, 1889 c g
 Calathus elpis Ortuño & Arillo, 2009 c g
 Calathus erratus (C.R.Sahlberg, 1827) c g
 Calathus erwini Ball and Nègre, 1972 i c g
 Calathus erzeliki Schweiger, 1977 c g
 Calathus extensicollis Putzeys, 1873 c g
 Calathus femoralis Chaudoir, 1846 c g
 Calathus fimbriatus Wollaston, 1858 c g
 Calathus focarilei Schatzmayr, 1947 c g
 Calathus fracassii Heyden, 1908 c g
 Calathus freyi Colas, 1941 c g
 Calathus fuscipes (Goeze, 1777) i c g b
 Calathus gansuensis (Jedlicka, 1937) c g
 Calathus gelascens Andrewes, 1934 c g
 Calathus giganteus Dejean, 1828 c g
 Calathus glabricollis Dejean, 1828 c g
 Calathus gomerensis Colas, 1943 c g
 Calathus gonzalezi Mateu, 1956 c g
 Calathus granatensis Vuillefroy, 1866 c g
 Calathus grandiceps (Kurnakov, 1961) c g
 Calathus gregarius (Say, 1823) i c g b
 Calathus gugheensis Basilewsky, 1953 c g
 Calathus gunaensis Lassalle, 2016 c g
 Calathus heinertzi Deuve; Lassalle & Queinnec, 1985 c g
 Calathus heinzianus F.Battoni, 1986 c g
 Calathus himalayae Bates, 1891 c g
 Calathus hispanicus Gautier des Cottes, 1866 c g
 Calathus holzschuhi Kirschenhofer, 1990 c g
 Calathus horsti (Reitter, 1888) c g
 Calathus hyrcanus Heinz, 1970 c g
 Calathus ingratus Dejean, 1828 i c g b
 Calathus jacupicensis Gueorgiuev, 2008 g
 Calathus jakupicensis B.V.Gueorguiev, 2008 c g
 Calathus juan Novoa & Gañán, 2014 c g
 Calathus kebedei Novoa; Gañan & Baselga, 2015 c g
 Calathus kirschenhoferi F.Battoni, 1982 c g
 Calathus kirschenhoferianus F.Battoni, 1986 c g
 Calathus kollari Putzeys, 1873 c g
 Calathus korax Reitter, 1889 c g
 Calathus kryzhanovskii J.Schmidt, 1999 c g
 Calathus laticaudis (Kurnakov, 1961) c g
 Calathus laureticola Wollaston, 1865 c g
 Calathus leechi Ball and Nègre, 1972 i c g
 Calathus leptodactylus Putzeys, 1873 c g
 Calathus libanensis Putzeys, 1873 c g
 Calathus lissoderus Putzeys, 1873 c g
 Calathus longicollis Motschulsky, 1865 c g
 Calathus luctuosus (Latreille, 1804) c g
 Calathus lundbladi Colas, 1938 c g
 Calathus macedonicus Maran, 1935 c g
 Calathus malacensis Nègre, 1966 c g
 Calathus manasluensis J.Schmidt, 1999 c g
 Calathus mandibularis (Kurnakov, 1961) c g
 Calathus marcellae Colas, 1943 c g
 Calathus marmoreus Ball and Nègre, 1972 i c g
 Calathus melanocephalus (Linnaeus, 1758) i c g
 Calathus metallicus Dejean, 1828 c g
 Calathus mexicanus Chaudoir, 1837 i c g
 Calathus micropterus (Duftschmid, 1812) c g
 Calathus minutus Gautier des Cottes, 1866 c g
 Calathus mirei Nègre, 1966 c g
 Calathus mollis (Marsham, 1802) c g
 Calathus montanellus Heinz, 2000 c g
 Calathus montanus Alluaud, 1937 c g
 Calathus montivagus Dejean, 1831 c g
 Calathus moralesi Nègre, 1966 c g
 Calathus muchei Jedlicka, 1961 c g
 Calathus nitidus Basilewsky, 1957 c g
 Calathus obliteratus Wollaston, 1865 c g
 Calathus oertzeni Jeanne & F.Battoni, 1987 c g
 Calathus ollivieri Lassalle, 2016 c g
 Calathus opaculus Leconte, 1854 i c g b
 Calathus opacus Lucas, 1846 c g
 Calathus ordinatus Gautier des Cottes, 1870 c g
 Calathus oreades Nègre, 1966 c g
 Calathus oreobius Alluaud, 1937 c g
 Calathus orthomoides Alluaud, 1932 c g
 Calathus ovipennis Putzeys, 1873 i c g
 Calathus parvicollis Fairmaire, 1882 c g
 Calathus patrizii Basilewsky, 1953 c g
 Calathus pecoudi Colas, 1938 c g
 Calathus peltatus Kolenati, 1845 c g
 Calathus peropacus Casey, 1920 i c g
 Calathus pilosipennis Machado, 1992 c g
 Calathus pirazzolii Putzeys, 1873 c g
 Calathus pommeranzi J.Schmidt, 1999 c g
 Calathus potosi Ball and Nègre, 1972 i c g
 Calathus praestans (Heyden, 1885) c g
 Calathus pseudopraestans (Kurnakov, 1961) c g
 Calathus queinneci Lassalle, 2016 c g
 Calathus ras Basilewsky, 1957 c g
 Calathus ravasinii G.Müller, 1935 c g
 Calathus recticaudis (Kurnakov, 1961) c g
 Calathus rectus Wollaston, 1862 c g
 Calathus reebae Lassalle, 2016 c g
 Calathus reflexicollis Faldermann, 1839 c g
 Calathus refleximargo Machado, 1992 c g
 Calathus reflexus Schaum, 1858 c g
 Calathus relictus J.Schmidt & Tian, 2013 c g
 Calathus rhaticus Antoine, 1941 c g
 Calathus robustus (Kurnakov, 1961) c g
 Calathus roccai F.Battoni, 1984 c g
 Calathus rotgeri Ball and Nègre, 1972 i c g
 Calathus rotundatus Jacquelin du Val, 1857 c g
 Calathus rotundicollis Dejean, 1828 c g
 Calathus rubripes Dejean, 1831 c g
 Calathus ruficollis Dejean, 1828 i c g b
 Calathus rufocastaneus Wollaston, 1862 c g
 Calathus scotti Alluaud, 1937 c g
 Calathus scottianus Basilewsky, 1953 c g
 Calathus semisericeus Fairmaire, 1879 c g
 Calathus shoanus Alluaud, 1932 c g
 Calathus simienensis Basilewsky, 1957 c g
 Calathus simplicicollis Wollaston, 1862 c g
 Calathus sirentensis D'Amore Fracassi, 1908 c g
 Calathus solieri Bassi, 1834 c g
 Calathus sotshiensis (Zamotajlov, 1997) c g
 Calathus spretus Wollaston, 1862 c g
 Calathus stricticaudis (Kurnakov, 1961) c g
 Calathus subfuscus Wollaston, 1865 c g
 Calathus subpraestans (Kurnakov, 1961) c g
 Calathus suffuscus Andrewes, 1934 c g
 Calathus syriacus Chaudoir, 1863 c g
 Calathus theodori Ancey, 1882 c g
 Calathus tombesii F.Battoni, 1976 c g
 Calathus trapezicollis Alluaud, 1937 c g
 Calathus uniseriatus Vuillefroy, 1866 c g
 Calathus vagestriatus Fairmaire, 1882 c g
 Calathus vicenteorum Schatzmayr, 1937 c g
 Calathus vignatagliantii F.Battoni, 1986 c g
 Calathus vivesi Nègre, 1966 c g
 Calathus vividus (Fabricius, 1801) c g
 Calathus vuillefroyi Gautier des Cottes, 1867 c g
 Calathus whiteheadi Ball and Nègre, 1972 i c g
 Calathus wittmerianus Deuve; Lassalle & Queinnec, 1985 c g
 Calathus wolloensis Lassalle, 2016 c g
 Calathus zabroides Putzeys, 1873 c g

Data sources: i = ITIS, c = Catalogue of Life, g = GBIF, b = Bugguide.net

References

Calathus